Fat Deer Key is an island in the middle Florida Keys.

U.S. 1 (or the Overseas Highway) crosses the key near mile markers 53.5-56, between Long Point Key and Key Vaca.

It is entirely within the cities of Marathon, Florida and Key Colony Beach, Florida.

It has the only road leading to the city of Key Colony Beach, known as Sadowski Causeway.

References

Islands of the Florida Keys
Islands of Monroe County, Florida
Islands of Florida